Francis S.P. Ng (born 1940) is a Malaysian botanist of Chinese descent. Ng is a former Deputy Director-General of the Forest Research Institute Malaysia.

Author abbreviation

References

External links 
 F.S.P. Ng's blog

Living people
1940 births